The 2020 United States House of Representatives elections in Virginia was held on November 3, 2020, to elect the 11 U.S. representatives from the state of Virginia, one from each of the state's 11 congressional districts. The elections coincided with the 2020 U.S. presidential election, as well as other elections to the House of Representatives, elections to the United States Senate and various state and local elections.

Statewide results

By district

District 1

The 1st district is based in the western Chesapeake Bay, taking in the exurbs and suburbs of Washington, D.C. and Richmond, including Fredericksburg, Mechanicsville, and Montclair. The incumbent is Republican Rob Wittman, who was re-elected with 55.2% of the vote in 2018.

Republican primary

Candidates

Nominee
Rob Wittman, incumbent U.S. Representative

Democratic primary

Candidates

Nominee
Qasim Rashid, human rights lawyer and nominee for Virginia's 28th Senate district in 2019

Eliminated in primary
Vangie Williams, strategic planner and nominee for Virginia's 1st congressional district in 2018

Endorsements

Primary results

General election

Predictions

Results

District 2

The 2nd district is based in Hampton Roads, containing the cities of Norfolk, Virginia Beach, and Hampton. The incumbent is Democrat Elaine Luria, who flipped the district and was elected with 51.1% of the vote in 2018.

Democratic primary

Candidates

Nominee
Elaine Luria, incumbent U.S. Representative

Endorsements

Republican primary

Candidates

Nominee
 Scott Taylor, former U.S. Representative for Virginia's 2nd congressional district (2017–2019)

Eliminated in primary
 Jarome Bell, U.S Navy veteran
Ben Loyola, defense contractor and U.S. Navy veteran

Withdrawn
Andy Baan, cybersecurity expert

Endorsements

Primary results

General election

Predictions

Polling

Results

District 3

The 3rd district encompasses the inner Hampton Roads, including parts of Hampton and Norfolk, as well as Newport News. The incumbent is Democrat Bobby Scott, who was reelected with 91.2% of the vote in 2018 without major-party opposition.

Democratic primary

Candidates

Nominee
Bobby Scott, incumbent U.S. Representative

Republican primary

Candidates

Nominee
John Collick, U.S. Marine Corps veteran

Eliminated in primary
Madison Downs, teacher
George Yacus, performance improvement consultant for U.S. Coast Guard

Primary results

General election

Predictions

Results

District 4

The 4th district takes in Richmond and minimal portions of Southside Virginia, and stretches down into Chesapeake. The incumbent is Democrat Donald McEachin, who was re-elected with 62.6% of the vote in 2018.

Democratic primary

Candidates

Nominee
Donald McEachin, incumbent U.S. Representative

Eliminated in primary
R. Cazel Levine, former federal executive within U.S. Department of Defense

Primary results

Republican primary

Candidates

Nominee
 Leon Benjamin, pastor

General election

Predictions

Results

District 5

The 5th district stretches from Southside Virginia all the way to Northern Virginia, with the city of Charlottesville inside it.  The district is larger than six states.  The incumbent Republican Denver Riggleman, who was elected with 53.2% of the vote in 2018, was ousted by Bob Good in a district convention.

Republican convention

Candidates

Nominee
Bob Good, former Campbell County supervisor and former athletics director at Liberty University

Eliminated at convention
Denver Riggleman, incumbent U.S. Representative

Endorsements

Convention results

Democratic primary

Candidates

Nominee
Cameron Webb, internal medicine physician and former White House Fellow

Eliminated in primary
Roger Dean Huffstetler, U.S. Marine Corps veteran, entrepreneur, and candidate for Virginia's 5th congressional district in 2018
John Lesinski, Rappahannock County supervisor and retired U.S. Marine Corps colonel
Claire Russo, U.S. Marine Corps veteran

Withdrawn
Shadi Ayyas, physician
Kim Daugherty, attorney (endorsed Webb)

Endorsements

Primary results

General election

Endorsements

Predictions

Polling

Results

District 6

The 6th district is located in west-central Virginia taking in the Shenandoah Valley, including Lynchburg and Roanoke. The incumbent is Republican Ben Cline, who was elected with 59.7% of the vote in 2018.

Republican primary

Candidates

Nominee
Ben Cline, incumbent U.S. Representative

Democratic primary

Nominee
Nicholas Betts, law clerk

General election

Endorsements

Predictions

Results

District 7

The 7th district is based in central Virginia and encompasses suburban Richmond. The incumbent is Democrat Abigail Spanberger, who flipped the district and was elected with 50.3% of the vote in 2018.

Democratic primary

Candidates

Nominee
Abigail Spanberger, incumbent U.S. Representative

Endorsements

Republican convention

Candidates

Nominee
Nick Freitas, state delegate and candidate for U.S. Senate in 2018

Eliminated at convention
Peter Greenwald, U.S. Navy veteran and candidate for Virginia's 7th congressional district in 2014
Andrew Knaggs, former Deputy Assistant Secretary of Defense for Special Operations and Combating Terrorism (2017-2019)
John McGuire, state delegate
Tina Ramirez, nonprofit executive, congressional foreign policy adviser, and founder of the congressional international religious freedom caucus
Jason Roberge, attorney

Failed to qualify for convention
Mike Dickinson, businessman
Craig Ennis, construction worker

Declined
Bryce Reeves, state senator

Polling

Endorsements

General election

Predictions

Polling

Results

District 8

The 8th district is based in northern Virginia and encompasses the inner Washington, D.C. suburbs, including Arlington, Alexandria, and Falls Church. The incumbent is Democrat Don Beyer, who was re-elected with 76.1% of the vote in 2018.

Democratic primary

Candidates

Nominee
Don Beyer, incumbent U.S. Representative

Endorsements

Republican convention

Candidates

Nominee
Jeff Jordan, defense contractor

Eliminated at convention
Mark Ellmore, banker

General election

Predictions

Results

District 9

The 9th district takes in rural southwest Virginia, including Abingdon, Blacksburg, and Salem. The incumbent is Republican Morgan Griffith, who was re-elected with 65.2% of the vote in 2018.

Republican primary

Candidates

Nominee
Morgan Griffith, incumbent U.S. Representative

Democratic primary

Candidates

Withdrawn
Cameron Dickerson, CIA contractor (accepted Libertarian nomination instead)

Libertarian party

Failed to qualify
 Cameron Dickerson, CIA contractor

General election

Predictions

Results

District 10

The 10th district is based in northern Virginia and the D.C. metro area, encompassing Loudoun and parts of Fairfax, Prince William, Clarke and Frederick counties. The incumbent is Democrat Jennifer Wexton, who flipped the district and was elected with 56.1% of the vote in 2018.

Democratic primary

Candidates

Nominee
Jennifer Wexton, incumbent U.S. Representative

Endorsements

Republican convention

Candidates

Nominee
Aliscia Andrews, U.S. Marine Corps veteran

Eliminated at convention
Jeff Dove, U.S. Army veteran and nominee for Virginia's 11th congressional district in 2018
Rob Jones, U.S. Marine Corps veteran
 Matt Truong, businessman and tech executive

Endorsements

General election

Predictions

Polling

Results

District 11

The 11th district encompasses the southern and western suburbs of Washington, D.C., including Dale City, Fairfax, and Reston. The incumbent is Democrat Gerry Connolly, who was re-elected with 71.1% of the vote in 2018.

Democratic primary

Candidates

Nominee
Gerry Connolly, incumbent U.S. Representative

Eliminated in primary
Zainab Mohsini, activist

Endorsements

Primary results

Republican primary

Candidates

Nominee
Manga Anantatmula, businesswoman

General election

Predictions

Results

Notes

Partisan clients

References

External links
 
 
  (State affiliate of the U.S. League of Women Voters)
 

Official campaign websites for 1st district candidates
 Qasim Rashid (D) for Congress
 Rob Wittman (R) for Congress

Official campaign websites for 2nd district candidates
 David Foster (I) for Congress
 Elaine Luria (D) for Congress
 Scott Taylor (R) for Congress

Official campaign websites for 3rd district candidates
 John Collick (R) for Congress
 Bobby Scott (D) for Congress

Official campaign websites for 4th district candidates
 Leon Benjamin (R) for Congress
 Donald McEachin (D) for Congress

Official campaign websites for 5th district candidates
 Bob Good (R) for Congress
 Cameron Webb (D) for Congress

Official campaign websites for 6th district candidates
 Nicholas Betts (D) for Congress
 Ben Cline (R) for Congress

Official campaign websites for 7th district candidates
 Nick Freitas (R) for Congress
 Abigail Spanberger (D) for Congress

Official campaign websites for 8th district candidates
 Don Beyer (D) for Congress
 Jeff Jordan (R) for Congress
 Heerak Kim (I) for Congress 
 Mike Webb (I) for Congress

Official campaign websites for 9th district candidates
 Morgan Griffith (R) for Congress

Official campaign websites for 10th district candidates
 Aliscia Andrews (R) for Congress
 Jennifer Wexton (D) for Congress 

Official campaign websites for 11th district candidates
 Manga Anantatmula (R) for Congress
 Gerry Connolly (D) for Congress

Virginia
2020
House